Confluentibacter citreus  is a Gram-negative, aerobic and rod-shaped bacterium from the genus of Confluentibacter which has been isolated from the Sayram Lake in China.

References

External links
Type strain of Confluentibacter citreus at BacDive -  the Bacterial Diversity Metadatabase

Flavobacteria
Bacteria described in 2017